Kokiche Col (‘Sedlovina Kokiche’ \se-dlo-vi-'na ko-'ki-che\) is the ice-covered col of elevation 875 m extending 650 m on Trinity Peninsula in Graham Land, Antarctica, which is linking Aureole Hills to the northwest to Detroit Plateau to the southeast.

The col is named after the settlement of Kokiche in Southern Bulgaria.

Location
German-British mapping in 1996.

Maps
 Trinity Peninsula. Scale 1:250000 topographic map No. 5697. Institut für Angewandte Geodäsie and British Antarctic Survey, 1996.
 Antarctic Digital Database (ADD). Scale 1:250000 topographic map of Antarctica. Scientific Committee on Antarctic Research (SCAR). Since 1993, regularly updated.

Notes

References
 Kokiche Col. SCAR Composite Antarctic Gazetteer
 Bulgarian Antarctic Gazetteer. Antarctic Place-names Commission. (details in Bulgarian, basic data in English)

External links
 Kokiche Col. Copernix satellite image

Mountain passes of Trinity Peninsula
Bulgaria and the Antarctic